Thomas Wünsch (born 21 August 1962) is a German historian.

Life 
Born in Landshut, Wünsch studied history, philosophy and Slavic at the University of Regensburg from 1982 to 1988. On the allegorical interpretation of the Bible by Petrus Damiani. From 1991 to 1994, he worked as a historian at the Foundation House of Upper Silesia. There, he completed his habilitation in 1997 with a thesis on Conciliarism and Poland. From 1998 to 2003, Wünsch was a university lecturer in general and East Central European history of the Middle Ages. Since 2003, Wünsch has taught Modern and Contemporary History of Eastern Europe and its Cultures at the University of Passau. From 1993 to 1996, he edited the Upper Silesian Yearbook.

His research interests include parliamentary forms in church and state, religious sites of memory, the nobility in Silesia, humanism and the Renaissance in Eastern Europe, and Ruthenia.

Publications 
Monographs
 Deutsche und Slawen im Mittelalter: Beziehungen zu Tschechen, Polen, Südslawen und Russen. Oldenbourg, Munich 2008, .
 Konziliarismus und Polen: Personen, Politik und Programme aus Polen zur Verfassungsfrage der Kirche in der Zeit der mittelalterlichen Reformkonzilien. Schöningh, Paderborn among others 1998,  (in the same time Habilitations-Schrift for the Konstanz University 1997/98).
 Spiritalis intellegentia. Zur allegorischen Bibelinterpretation des Petrus Damiani (Theorie und Forschung. Vol. 190). Roderer, Regensburg 1991,  (in the same time Dissertation at the Regensburg University, 1991).

Editorships
 Religion und Magie in Ostmitteleuropa: Spielräume theologischer Normierungsprozesse in Spätmittelalter und Früher Neuzeit (Religions- und Kulturgeschichte in Ostmittel- und Südosteuropa. Bd. 8). Lit-Verlag, Berlin 2006, .
 Stadtgeschichte Oberschlesiens: Studien zur städtischen Entwicklung und Kultur einer ostmitteleuropäischen Region vom Mittelalter bis zum Vorabend der Industrialisierung (Tagungsreihe der Stiftung Haus Oberschlesien. Vol. 5). Mann, Berlin 1995, .
 Reformation und Gegenreformation in Oberschlesien. Die Auswirkungen auf Politik, Kunst und Kultur im ostmitteleuropäischen Kontext (Tagungsreihe der Stiftung Haus Oberschlesien. Vol. 3). Gebr. Mann, Berlin 1994, .

References

External links 
 
 Seite von Wünsch an der Universität Passau
Publikationen von und über Thomas Wünsch im Bibliotheks- und Bibliographieportal / 

20th-century German historians
1962 births
Living people
People from Landshut